Billion Oyster Project is a New York City-based nonprofit organization with the goal of engaging one million people in the effort to restore one billion oysters to New York Harbor by 2035. Because oysters are filter feeders, they serve as a natural water filter, with a number of beneficial effects for the ecosystem. The reefs they form increase habitat and subsequent marine biodiversity levels, and help protect the city's shorelines from storm surges.

Billion Oyster Project believes that engaging community members — especially young people — in reef restoration will lead them to become more environmentally aware in the future. The project aims to engage hundreds of thousands of students, teachers, and community scientists in marine restoration-based STEM educational programming. It involves 60+ restaurants in an oyster shell recycling program, which provides the project with shells for building new reefs.

The project grew out of the activities of students at the New York Harbor School, currently located on Governors Island, who started growing and restoring oysters in New York Harbor in 2008. The school continues to be the project’s main educational partnership - involving students through internships and waterfront experience in seven Career and Technical Education (CTE) programs. Along with Harbor School, Billion Oyster Project is stationed on Governors Island and the scope of their work is confined to the five boroughs of New York City.

History 

The initiative was the brainchild of Murray Fisher and Pete Malinowski, and grew out of the Urban Assembly New York Harbor School in 2014. A $5 million National Science Foundation grant allowed the program to spread to thousands of public middle school students starting in 2015.

Achievements 

More than 11,000 high school and middle school students have taken part in the project. Approximately  of oyster shell have been recycled. In 2020, expansion into mobile spawning tanks at Red Hook, Brooklyn allowed for significant increases in capacity.

Projects 
The Living Breakwaters is a project overseen by the Billion Oyster Project in Staten Island that uses oysters or oyster-tecture to protect from storm surge, increase biodiversity, clean water, and create educational opportunities. This project is in part funded by the federal Department of Housing and Urban Development. They have contributed $60 million partly for the purpose of disaster recovery from Hurricane Sandy, but also to prevent similar disasters in the future. Staten Island was greatly affected by erosion and flooding in that 2012 storm, particularly along the south shore. This project will start in Tottenville. Tottenville used to be famous for their oyster population and this project aims to bring back the presence of that marine life. It is a solution that uses natural reentry of a previously existing population rather than risking an invasive species. The process that the Billion Oyster Project plans to go through starts with more than 70 New York restaurants saving their oysters shells. Then those shells are left outside for a year to be cleaned completely organically and to rid the shells of any human chemicals. Baby oysters are then placed in the shells. The oysters are young and won’t be able to fight off any chemicals. The larvae are placed in the shells at New York Harbor School. This is a public high school focused on marine life. The oysters will be placed on to a wall made of low acidity permeable concrete. Local Tottenville elementary school teacher, Deb Amoroso, has received training from the Billion Oyster Projects and will monitor the growth of oysters with her class. They will help collect shells to install as well as watch (and discuss) the progress of the ecosystem. The plan for Living Breakwaters is all encompassing. It includes the steps of reducing risk and fragility, building up ecology leading to greater biodiversity, and benefiting the surrounding area through community partnering. The oysters on the wall will create a strong and more natural barrier as a form of risk management for the rise in storm frequency and sea level rise with climate change. The oysters will bring in their prey as well as naturally filter the water making it more attractive to marine life. This growing ecosystem is a large opportunity for local classrooms to get involved and see marine biology in action. The people have a voice in the project too. The Living Breakwaters citizens advisory committee was established in 2015 and looks to gather opinions of the locals on decisions through the project. Project construction is supposed to start in late 2019.

References 

Water resources management
Citizen science
2008 establishments in New York City
Non-profit organizations based in New York City